Sporobolus flexuosus is a species of grass known by the common name mesa dropseed. It is native to western North America, where it can be found in the deserts and woodlands of the Southwestern United States and Northern Mexico.

It is a perennial grass but it is short-lived and is sometimes an annual. The inflorescence is an open panicle of spreading branches bearing grayish spikelets.

References

External links
Jepson Manual Treatment of Sporobolus flexuosus
Grass Manual Treatment

flexuosus
Bunchgrasses of North America
Grasses of Mexico
Grasses of the United States
Native grasses of California
Native grasses of Texas
Flora of the California desert regions
Flora of the Great Basin
Flora of the Southwestern United States
Flora of Northwestern Mexico
Flora of Northeastern Mexico
Natural history of the Colorado Desert
Natural history of the Mojave Desert
North American desert flora
Flora without expected TNC conservation status